2 Much Drama is the debut album by American basketball player Chris Webber, released under his nickname C. Webb. Released on February 16, 1999 for independent label, Lightyear Records, the single "Gangsta, Gangsta (How U Do It)" peaked at number 10 on the Hot Rap Singles chart. Guests include Redman and Kurupt.

Track listing

References

1999 debut albums
Albums produced by Amp Fiddler
Chris Webber albums